(John) Barrie Evans (1923-2009) was a senior Welsh Anglican priest.

Evans was educated at St David's College, Lampeter, St Edmund Hall, Oxford and St Michael's College, Llandaff. He was ordained deacon in 1951 and priest in 1952. After a curacy in Trevethin  he held incumbencies at Caerwent then Chepstow. Tyte was Archdeacon of Monmouth from 1977 to 1986; and Archdeacon of Newport from 1986 to 1993.

References

1931 births
20th-century Welsh Anglican priests
21st-century Welsh Anglican priests
2009 deaths
Archdeacons of Monmouth
Alumni of the University of Wales, Lampeter
Alumni of St Edmund Hall, Oxford
Alumni of St Michael's College, Llandaff
Archdeacons of Newport